Somosierra is a mountain pass in the Sierra de Guadarrama north of Madrid in Spain.  It connects the north of the Community of Madrid with the east of the province of Segovia.  Just south of the pass is the municipality of Somosierra with a population of 77.

There is also a  rail tunnel.

History
The road was originally a track opened up by Napoleon to provide a direct route to Madrid. In 1808 this led to the Battle of Somosierra between French-Polish and Spanish forces.

In 1936,  at the beginning of the Spanish Civil War, the Battle of Somosierra (1936) took place in the heights of the pass between Carlist and Falangist units and Spanish Republican Army troops.

References

External links
Cerro Pelado y Paredes de Buitrago

Mountain passes of Spain
Landforms of the Community of Madrid
Mountain passes of the Sistema Central